Mir Mohammad (also Romanized as Mīr Moḩammad and Mīr Muhammad; also known as Mīr Moḩammadī) is a village in Balaband Rural District, in the Central District of Fariman County, Razavi Khorasan Province, Iran. At the 2006 census, its population was 188, in 47 families.

References 

Populated places in Fariman County